Lars Fredrik "Lasse" Qvigstad (born 2 February 1946) is a Norwegian jurist.

He was born in Oslo. He worked as a lecturer at the University of Oslo from 1972 to 1975, public prosecutor in Eidsivating from 1977 to 1987, deputy chief of police in Oslo from 1987 to 1991 and presiding judge in Eidsivating from 1991 to 1993. He then returned to the position as public prosecutor, on a national level.

References

1946 births
Living people
Judges from Oslo
Academic staff of the University of Oslo
Police officers from Oslo